Daniel Bernoulli FRS (– 27 March 1782) was a Swiss mathematician and physicist and was one of the many prominent mathematicians in the Bernoulli family from Basel. He is particularly remembered for his applications of mathematics to mechanics, especially fluid mechanics, and for his pioneering work in probability and statistics. His name is commemorated in the Bernoulli's principle, a particular example of the conservation of energy, which describes the mathematics of the mechanism underlying the operation of two important technologies of the 20th century: the carburetor and the airplane wing.

Early life

Daniel Bernoulli was born in Groningen, in the Netherlands, into a family of distinguished mathematicians. 
The Bernoulli family came originally from Antwerp, at that time in the Spanish Netherlands, but emigrated to escape the Spanish persecution of the Protestants. After a brief period in Frankfurt the family moved to Basel, in Switzerland.

Daniel was the son of Johann Bernoulli (one of the early developers of calculus) and a nephew of Jacob Bernoulli (an early researcher in probability theory and the discoverer of the mathematical constant e). He had two brothers, Niklaus and Johann II. Daniel Bernoulli was described by W. W. Rouse Ball as "by far the ablest of the younger Bernoullis". He is said to have had a bad relationship with his father. Upon both of them entering and tying for first place in a scientific contest at the University of Paris, Johann, unable to bear the "shame" of being compared  Daniel's equal, banned Daniel from his house. Johann Bernoulli also plagiarized some key ideas from Daniel's book Hydrodynamica in his own book Hydraulica which he backdated to before Hydrodynamica. Despite Daniel's attempts at reconciliation, his father carried the grudge until his death.

Around schooling age, his father, Johann Bernoulli, encouraged him to study business, there being poor rewards awaiting a mathematician. However, Daniel refused, because he wanted to study mathematics. He later gave in to his father's wish and studied business. His father then asked him to study in medicine, and Daniel agreed under the condition that his father would teach him mathematics privately, which they continued for some time.  Daniel studied medicine at Basel, Heidelberg, and Strasbourg, and earned a PhD in anatomy and botany in 1721.

He was a contemporary and close friend of Leonhard Euler. He went to St. Petersburg in 1724 as professor of mathematics, but was very unhappy there. A temporary illness together with the censorship by the Russian Orthodox Church and disagreements over his salary gave him an excuse for leaving St. Petersburg in 1733. He returned to the University of Basel, where he successively held the chairs of medicine, metaphysics, and natural philosophy until his death.

In May, 1750 he was elected a Fellow of the Royal Society.

Mathematical work

His earliest mathematical work was the Exercitationes (Mathematical Exercises), published in 1724 with the help of Goldbach.  Two years later he pointed out for the first time the frequent desirability of resolving a compound motion into motions of translation and motion of rotation.  His chief work is Hydrodynamica, published in 1738. It resembles Joseph Louis Lagrange's Mécanique Analytique in being arranged so that all the results are consequences of a single principle, namely, conservation of energy.  This was followed by a memoir on the theory of the tides, to which, conjointly with the memoirs by Euler and Colin Maclaurin, a prize was awarded by the French Academy: these three memoirs contain all that was done on this subject between the publication of Isaac Newton's Philosophiae Naturalis Principia Mathematica and the investigations of Pierre-Simon Laplace.  Bernoulli also wrote a large number of papers on various mechanical questions, especially on problems connected with vibrating strings, and the solutions given by Brook Taylor and by Jean le Rond d'Alembert.

Together Bernoulli and Euler tried to discover more about the flow of fluids. In particular, they wanted to know about the relationship between the speed at which blood flows and its pressure. To investigate this, Daniel experimented by puncturing the wall of a pipe with a small open ended straw and noted that the height to which the fluid rose up the straw was related to fluid's pressure in the pipe.

Soon physicians all over Europe were measuring patients' blood pressure by sticking point-ended glass tubes directly into their arteries. It was not until about 170 years later, in 1896 that an Italian doctor discovered a less painful method which is still in use today. However, Bernoulli's method of measuring pressure is still used today in modern aircraft to measure the speed of the air passing the plane; that is its air speed.

Taking his discoveries further, Daniel Bernoulli now returned to his earlier work on Conservation of Energy. It was known that a moving body exchanges its kinetic energy for potential energy when it gains height. Daniel realised that in a similar way, a moving fluid exchanges its specific kinetic energy for pressure, the former being the kinetic energy per unit volume. Mathematically this law is now written:

 

where P is pressure, ρ is the density of the fluid and u is its velocity.

Economics and statistics
In his 1738 book Specimen theoriae novae de mensura sortis (Exposition of a New Theory on the Measurement of Risk), Bernoulli offered a solution to the St. Petersburg paradox as the basis of the economic theory of risk aversion, risk premium, and utility.  Bernoulli often noticed that when making decisions that involved some uncertainty, people did not always try to maximize their possible monetary gain, but rather tried to maximize "utility", an economic term encompassing their personal satisfaction and benefit. Bernoulli realized that for humans, there is a direct relationship between money gained and utility, but that it diminishes as the money gained increases.  For example, to a person whose income is $10,000 per year, an additional $100 in income will provide more utility than it would to a person whose income is $50,000 per year.

One of the earliest attempts to analyze a statistical problem involving censored data was Bernoulli's 1766 analysis of smallpox morbidity and mortality data to demonstrate the efficacy of inoculation.

Physics
In Hydrodynamica (1738) he laid the basis for the kinetic theory of gases, and applied the idea to explain Boyle's law.

He worked with Euler on elasticity and the development of the Euler–Bernoulli beam equation. Bernoulli's principle is of critical use in aerodynamics.

According to Léon Brillouin, the principle of superposition was first stated by Daniel Bernoulli in 1753: "The general motion of a vibrating system is given by a superposition of its proper vibrations."

Works

Legacy
In 2002, Bernoulli was inducted into the International Air & Space Hall of Fame at the San Diego Air & Space Museum.

See also
 Bernoulli's principle
 Euler–Bernoulli beam equation
 St. Petersburg paradox
 Hydrodynamica

References

Footnotes

Works cited

(Original entry based on the public domain Rouse History of Mathematics)

 

External links

 
 Rothbard, Murray. Daniel Bernoulli and the Founding of Mathematical Economics, Mises Institute (excerpted from An Austrian Perspective on the History of Economic Thought'')
 
 
 

1700 births
1782 deaths
Daniel
Heidelberg University alumni
18th-century Swiss physicists
18th-century Latin-language writers
18th-century male writers
18th-century Swiss mathematicians
Swiss Calvinist and Reformed Christians
Mathematical analysts
Fluid dynamicists
Probability theorists
Fellows of the Royal Society
Full members of the Saint Petersburg Academy of Sciences
Swiss expatriates in the Dutch Republic
Scientists from Groningen (city)
Swiss expatriates in Germany
People associated with the University of Basel